The YMCA NSW Youth Parliament is an apolitical YMCA Youth Parliament program coordinated by the YMCA NSW, and acts as a platform for youth advocacy for 15-18 year olds. Participants spend time in committees developing bills and reports and then attend a week-long camp during which the legislation, reports and other motions are debated in the NSW Parliament. Bills passed by both houses are given Royal Assent by the Youth Governor and handed to the state Government and Opposition for consideration.

Overview 
The YMCA NSW Youth Parliament is a YMCA sponsored youth model parliament programme. The program was first launched in 2002, attracting 32 participants representing regional teams from across New South Wales. The program has continued since and is in its 19th year. There is a YMCA youth parliament in every Australian State and Territory.

Young People aged 15–18 may apply for the program or seek selection from their local MP or MLC. Successful applicants are then sorted into committees according to their preferences and begin to create a bill or a report to amend an issue in NSW.

Participants represent their local Member of Parliament and meet during a weekend long training camp where they learn the workings of the 'bearpit' and how to create a bill or report. Youth MP's then spend time in the Legislative Assembly or the Legislative Council debating, amending and voting on bills and general motions, including Question Time. Approximately six pieces of YMCA NSW Youth Parliament legislation have been passed into NSW Law including the Domestic Violence Disclosure Scheme.

Youth Leadership

During the Training Camp, Youth MP's may nominate themselves for leadership positions including Premier, Deputy Premier, Opposition Leader, Leader of the House/Manager of Opposition Business, and Party Whips. A vote of the participant body is then held to determine the leadership team for the respective calendar year. With the introduction of a bicameral parliament, further leadership positions have been made available to serve the Legislative Council, such as Leader of the Government in the Legislative Council.

Youth Parliamentarians also have the opportunity to become either Ministers in the Government or Shadow Ministers of the Opposition. Those elevated to these positions are elected by their peers in portfolios to take on the role of lead sponsor or refuter of their respective portfolio. This is replicated in the Legislative Council with chairpersons of committees and ministers representing legislative assembly portfolios. There are additional leadership roles, such as government whip, opposition whip (in both houses) and regional ministers (in the legislative assembly).

Participants also have the chance to attend the Governors Reception at Government House.

Youth Governor 
The position of Youth Governor, voted in and selected by the volunteer taskforce and participants, is charged with overseeing and representing the program as well as signing off on bills that are passed.

Former Youth Governors

Taskforce 

The program is facilitated and supported by a group of volunteers aged between 18 and 25 years and typically are also past participants, these taskforce volunteers or 'taskies' are the lifeblood of NSW Youth Parliament. The YMCA NSW Youth Parliament is the only Youth Parliament across Australia that does not receive funding from the State Government. 
YMCA funding and a dedicated volunteer taskforce continue to run Youth Parliament. The YMCA NSW Youth Parliament also offers the Press Gallery program. This is an internship program for eligible students facilitating experience in journalism, advocacy, public relations and political reporting as part of the Youth & Government suite of programs.

Programs 
The Youth Parliament has held conferences since 2002, creating and debating bills on a wide range of topics. The YMCA NSW Youth Parliament was held at Sydney Olympic Park Lodge (SOPL) at the Newington Armory in Sydney's Western Suburbs.

The Youth Parliament passed the Same-Sex Marriage Matter of Public Importance (MPI) in 2012 with 70 ayes to 11 noes, with the largest majority of all Youth Parliaments in Australia debating this issue. The young parliamentary members represented the spectrum of opinions. One member stated his belief in the importance of the MPI as a member of the gay community, while another voted against the MPI due to religious beliefs.

In 2013, the Parliamentary and Legal Reform Committee Debated the Marriage Equality Bill 2013. This passed unanimously with 72 ayes to 0 noes. Following the passing of the Bill, the chamber began to sing 'Advance Australia Fair'. This is a first for the YMCA NSW Youth Parliament. The Bill also passed in the Legislative Council with 40 ayes to 4 noes.

In 2019, the Aboriginal Affairs Committee debated a bill to establish an Aboriginal and Torres Strait Islander Advisory Committee within all NSW schools. This is to help improve the cultural standpoints and enable self-determination of Aboriginal people and their communities. This passed unanimously with 67 ayes to 0 noes. The bill was even more significant with the programs first ever Aboriginal premier ushering it through the chamber.

During the 2021/22 program, members from the Aboriginal Affairs, Women's Affairs, Regional and Rural Affairs, and Justice committees united in delivering their Private Members' Statements on the issue of Australia's national public holiday (26 January). The Youth MPs were commended for their bipartisanship and collaboration in uniting on such an important and pressing issue.

In 2021/22, the Transport and Roads Committee debated a bill to launch a long-term comprehensive transportation infrastructure blueprint for the 21st Century, this vision included projects to positively impact all residents across New South Wales. Examples listed in the Future of Accessible Statewide Transport Act 2021 included the addition of light rail in Sydney, Wollongong, and Newcastle CBDs, a bus relocation program to regional NSW, upgrades of rural roads, expansion of ferry services within Greater Sydney, and a new Outer Sydney Orbital Motorway. Building greater Metro systems was another vision, with the integration of new Metro transit lines into the existing Sydney Trains network, along with the conversion of some lines. This overwhelmingly passed the with 30 ayes to 10 noes. Although topical, 'Asset Recycling' was the main source to fund such projects and initiatives.

In 2021/22, the Aboriginal Affairs Committee advocated for a Bill to implement a framework for cultural education within the NSW juvenile justice system. The Aboriginal Education in Juvenile Detention Bill 2021 outlined the committee's vision for fair and equitable treatment of incarcerated Aboriginal and Torres Strait Islander young people. The Bill was passed unanimously and unamended. In March 2022, the Bill was officially presented to The Hon. Ben Franklin, Minister for Aboriginal Affairs, the Arts, and Regional Youth.

See also 
 YMCA Queensland Youth Parliament
 YMCA Youth and Government, United States
 Youth council

References

External links 
Youth & Government (official site)
YMCA NSW Youth Parliament
Official Blog
YMP Blog
Official Twitter
Official YouTube
Official Facebook

Australian youth parliaments
NSW
Youth councils